Spilosoma vestalis, the Vestal tiger-moth, is a moth in the family Erebidae. It was described by Alpheus Spring Packard in 1864. It is found along the coast of western North America, from California north to the Kitsap Peninsula in Washington and western Idaho. 

The length of the forewings is 19–26 mm.  Adults are on wing from May to June.

The larvae feed on various plants, including Alnus rubra and Quercus garryana.

References

Spilosoma vestalis at BOLD
Spilosoma vestalis at EOL
Spilosoma vestalis at BHL

Moths described in 1864
vestalis